Imran Nshimiyimana (born 18 August 1994) is a Rwandan international footballer who plays for AS Kigali, as a midfielder.

Career
Born in Kigali, Nshimiyimana has played for AS Kigali and Police.

He made his senior international debut for the Rwandan national team in 2012, and has appeared in FIFA World Cup qualifying matches for them.

References

1994 births
Living people
Rwandan footballers
Rwanda international footballers
AS Kigali FC players
Police F.C. (Rwanda) players
Association football midfielders
People from Kigali
2016 African Nations Championship players
Rwanda A' international footballers